The 2020 Nashville SC season was the club's first season as an organization and its first season as a member of Major League Soccer, after two seasons in the Eastern Conference of the USL Championship by a club of the same name.

Despite a brief stint in the Western Conference, the club moved to the Eastern Conference after the MLS is Back Tournament.

Club

Current roster

Roster transactions

In

Out

Additional source for roster transaction dates:

Re-Entry Draft pick

Expansion Draft picks

SuperDraft picks

Competitions

Exhibitions

Major League Soccer

League tables

Eastern Conference

Overall

Match results

MLS Cup Playoffs

MLS is Back Tournament

U.S. Open Cup 

As a new MLS club, Nashville was scheduled to enter the competition in the Third Round, to be played April 21–23. The ongoing coronavirus pandemic, however, forced the U.S. Soccer Federation to cancel the tournament on August 17, 2020.

References

Nashville SC seasons
Nashville SC
Nashville SC
Nashville SC